Vasily Skrotsky (born 1 January 1878 (unknown OS/NS), date of death unknown) was a Russian Empire sport shooter who competed in the 1912 Summer Olympics.

In the 1912 Summer Olympics he participated in the following events:

 Team running deer, single shots - fifth place
 running deer, single shots - 15th place
 running deer, double shots - 20th place

References

External links
list of Russian shooters

1878 births
Year of death missing
Male sport shooters from the Russian Empire
Running target shooters
Olympic competitors for the Russian Empire
Shooters at the 1912 Summer Olympics